The 1989 Cupa României Final was the 51st final of Romania's most prestigious football cup competition. It was disputed between Steaua București and Dinamo București, and was won by Steaua București after a game with one goal. It was the 17th cup for Steaua București, but when the club officially renounced in 1990 at the trophy won in 1988, it became the 16th cup.

Route to the final

Match details

See also
List of Cupa României finals

References

External links
Romaniansoccer.ro

1989
Cupa
Romania
FC Steaua București matches